The Aeroflot House is a constructivist building in Tsentralny District of Novosibirsk, Russia. It is located on the corner of Krasny Avenue and Yadrintsevskaya Street. The building was built in the 1930s.

History
The building was built for the Aeroflot. The architect is unknown.

The Aeroflot House is painted light blue

Gallery

See also
 Polyclinic No. 1
 Gosbank Building
 Soyuzzoloto House

References

Tsentralny City District, Novosibirsk
Buildings and structures in Novosibirsk
Buildings and structures completed in the 1930s
Constructivist architecture
Aeroflot
Cultural heritage monuments of regional significance in Novosibirsk Oblast